Cryphocricos is a genus of creeping water bugs in the family Naucoridae. There are about 15 described species in Cryphocricos.

Species
These 15 species belong to the genus Cryphocricos:

 Cryphocricos barozzi Signoret, 1850
 Cryphocricos barozzii Signoret, 1850
 Cryphocricos breddini Montandon, 1911
 Cryphocricos daguerrei De Carlo, 1940
 Cryphocricos fittkaui De Carlo, 1967
 Cryphocricos granulosus De Carlo, 1967
 Cryphocricos hungerfordi Usinger, 1947
 Cryphocricos latus Usinger, 1947
 Cryphocricos mexicanus Usinger, 1947
 Cryphocricos montei De Carlo, 1951
 Cryphocricos obscuratus Usinger, 1947
 Cryphocricos peruvianus De Carlo, 1940
 Cryphocricos rufus De Carlo, 1940
 Cryphocricos schubarti De Carlo, 1968
 Cryphocricos vianai De Carlo, 1951

References

Further reading

 
 
 

Naucoridae
Nepomorpha genera
Articles created by Qbugbot